Valley View Public School may refer to:

Canada:
 Valley View Public School, Ajax, Ontario; see Durham District School Board
 Valley View Public School, Val Caron, Ontario; see Rainbow District School Board